Michael Thelen (April 10, 1834 – 1918) was a member of the Wisconsin State Assembly during the 1879 session.

Thelen was born on April 10, 1834 in Germany. He died in 1918.

Political career
He was a Democrat, and he represented the 4th District of Fond du Lac County, Wisconsin. In 1886, he served on a state tax commission.

References

External links
 

German emigrants to the United States
People from Fond du Lac County, Wisconsin
1834 births
1918 deaths
Democratic Party members of the Wisconsin State Assembly